Stefania Świerzy (19 June 1934 – 11 June 2020) was a Polish gymnast. She competed in seven events at the 1952 Summer Olympics.

References

External links
 

1934 births
2020 deaths
Polish female artistic gymnasts
Olympic gymnasts of Poland
Gymnasts at the 1952 Summer Olympics
Sportspeople from Ruda Śląska